The governor of Texas is the head of government of the U.S. State of Texas, the presiding officer over the executive branch of the government of Texas, and the commander-in-chief of the Texas National Guard, the state's militia. The governor has the power to consider bills passed by the Texas Legislature, by signing them into law, or vetoing them, and in bills relating to appropriations, the power of a line-item veto. They may convene the legislature, and grant pardons and reprieves, except in cases of impeachment, and upon the permission of the legislature, in cases of treason. The state provides an official residence, the Governor's Mansion in Austin. The incumbent, Greg Abbott, is the forty-eighth governor to serve in the office since Texas' statehood in 1845.

When compared to those of other states, the governorship of Texas has been described as one of relative weakness. In some respects, it is the lieutenant governor of Texas, who presides over the Texas Senate, who possesses greater influence to exercise their prerogatives.

The governor is inaugurated on the third Tuesday of January every four years along with the lieutenant governor, and serves a term of four years. Prior to the present laws, in 1845, the state's first constitution established the office of governor, serving a term of two years, but no more than four years of every six. The 1861 constitution, following secession from the Union, established the first Monday of November following election as the term's start. Following the end of the American Civil War, the 1866 constitution increased term length to four years, limiting overall service to no more than eight years of every twelve, moving the term's start to the first Thursday following organization of the legislature, or "as soon thereafter as practicable." The constitution of 1869, enacted during Reconstruction, removed term limitations, to this day making Texas one of sixteen states, territory or jurisdiction (including the U.S. Territory Puerto Rico and the District of Columbia with no limit on gubernatorial terms. The present constitution of 1876 returned terms to two years, but a 1972 amendment again returned them to four.

Rick Perry is the longest-serving governor in state history, having assumed the governorship in 2000 upon the exit of George W. Bush, who resigned to take office as the 43rd president of the United States. Perry was elected in 2002 and he was re-elected in 2006 and 2010 serving for 14 years before choosing to retire in 2014.

Allan Shivers assumed the governorship upon the death of Beauford Jester in July 1949 and was elected in 1950 and re-elected in 1952 and 1954, serving for  years, making him the third longest serving governor before choosing to retire in 1956. Price Daniel was elected to the governorship in 1956 and re-elected in 1958 and 1960 before losing his re-election for an unprecedented fourth term in the 1962 Democratic primary, missing the runoff. John Connally was elected in 1962 and re-elected in 1964 and 1966 before choosing to retire in 1968, leaving office on January 21, 1969. Bill Clements served two non-consecutive four-year terms, having been elected in 1978 but lost re-election in 1982 before winning re-election in 1986, choosing to retire in 1990, was the second longest-serving governor: both of Shivers and Clements' records were surpassed by Perry.

Current Governor Greg Abbott was elected in 2014 and re-elected in 2018 and again in 2022. With his recent re-election, Abbott is on track to becoming the state's second longest-serving governor with 12 years of service by January 19, 2027.

In the case of a vacancy in the office, the lieutenant governor becomes governor. Prior to a 1999 amendment, the lieutenant governor only acted as governor until the expiration of the term to which he succeeded.

Governors of Spanish Texas 
See: List of Texas Governors and Presidents

Governors of Mexican Texas 
See: List of Texas Governors and Presidents

Governors of Texas

Succession

See also

List of Texas governors and presidents
List of presidents of the Republic of Texas
List of lieutenant governors of Texas

Notes

References

External links 
General
 Legislative Reference Library of Texas -- Governors of Texas
 
 The Handbook of Texas Online: Texas History Quiz -- Presidents and Governors of Texas
 Explanation of the strengths of governors

Constitutions
 1876 Constitution, as amended (Current)
 1876 Constitution
 1869 Constitution
 1866 Constitution
 1861 Constitution
 1845 Constitution

Lists of state governors of the United States
Governors